Cheng Hui (born 2 August 1997) is a Chinese footballer.

Club career
Cheng Hui would play in Spain for the Lleida Esportiu B team before being promoted to their senior team where he made his debut appearance for third tier Spanish club Lleida Esportiu on 9 January 2018 in a Copa del Rey game against Atlético Madrid in a 3-0 defeat. He returned to China to join top tier club Dalian Professional where he made his debut on 1 December 2019 in a league game against Beijing Renhe F.C. that ended in a 2-0 victory.

Career statistics

Notes

References

External links

1997 births
Living people
Chinese footballers
China youth international footballers
Chinese expatriate footballers
Association football midfielders
Chinese Super League players
CE Sabadell FC footballers
Lleida Esportiu footballers
Dalian Professional F.C. players
Chinese expatriate sportspeople in Spain
Expatriate footballers in Spain